Bentivar is an unincorporated community in Albemarle County, Virginia.

This neighborhood sits on land once owned by the Carr family back in the late 1790s. The oldest estate dates back to approximately 1830 with some of the most recent homes constructed in the 2000s.

References

Unincorporated communities in Virginia
Unincorporated communities in Albemarle County, Virginia
National Register of Historic Places in Albemarle County, Virginia